Osusznica  is a village in Gmina Lipnica, Bytów County, Pomeranian Voivodeship, in northern Poland. It is located within the ethnocultural region of Kashubia in the historic region of Pomerania.

It has a population of 124.

History
Osusznica was a royal village of the Polish Crown, administratively located in the Człuchów County in the Pomeranian Voivodeship.

From 1975 to 1998 the village was in Słupsk Voivodeship.

Notable people
  (1933–2009), Polish painter, born in the village

References

Map of the Gmina Lipnica

Osusznica